Sardinella pacifica is a species of marine fish of the sardines in the family Clupeidae belonging to the genus Sardinella, which is endemic to the waters around the Philippines. This species was first described in 2019, with 21 preserved specimens, discovered and known only in the Philippines. It is characterized with centrally discontinuous striae in its lateral scales, dorsal fin origin with a dark spot, lower gill rakers which is more than 70 on the first gill arch, eight rays of the pelvic fin, and 17-18 prepelvic and 12-13 postpelvic scutes, all of which it closely resembled that of Sardinella fimbriata. However, the two species differs in that, S. pacifica have lower count of lateral scales (38-41 compared to S. fimbriata, 44–46), lower count of pseudobranchial filaments(14-19 compared to S. fimbriata, 19–22), postpelvic scutes(12-13 compared to S. fimbriata, 13–14), and shorter lower jaw(10.4–11.6% of standard length compared to that of S. fimbriata which is 11.1–12.2% of standard length). The fish's gill rakers was considered as the species adaptation to Philippine waters.

Distribution and habitat
Sardinella pacifica was currently known in the Philippines particularly in Quezon, Sorsogon, Samar and the Manila Bay.

Etymology
The scientific nomenclature uses the word pacifica which refers to the Pacific Ocean, with the purpose of distinguishing the species from S. fimbriata which it was confused with, thereby, now restricting the latter to Indian Ocean.

References

Sardinella
Fauna of the Philippines